The 1859 Massachusetts gubernatorial elections was held on November 2. Incumbent Republican Governor Nathaniel Banks was easily re-elected to a third term in office in a race featuring three Governors of Massachusetts: incumbent Governor Banks, former Governor George Nixon Briggs (1844–51), and future Governor Benjamin Franklin Butler (1882–83).

General election

Candidates
 Nathaniel Prentiss Banks, incumbent Governor (Republican)
 George Nixon Briggs, former Governor of Massachusetts (1844–51) (American)
 Benjamin Franklin Butler, State Senator from Lowell (Democratic)

Results

See also
 1859 Massachusetts legislature

References

Governor
1859
Massachusetts
November 1859 events